Lena Olsson (born 1958) is a Swedish Left Party politician. She was a member of the Riksdag until 2006. She was also a member from 1998 to 2002. She was a member of Parliament up to 2014.

References

Members of the Riksdag from the Left Party (Sweden)
Living people
1958 births
Women members of the Riksdag
20th-century Swedish women politicians
20th-century Swedish politicians
21st-century Swedish women politicians